Pinnacle Glacier may refer to:

Pinnacle Glacier (Lewis County, Washington)
Pinnacle Glacier (Mount Adams)